Events from the 4th century in Roman Britain.

Events
 301
 Emperor Diocletian fixes the prices of British woollen goods and beer.
 306
 25 July – Emperor Constantius Chlorus dies at Eboracum (York), after campaigning against the Picts. His son Constantine the Great is acclaimed as his successor by the troops here.
 314
 The reforms of Diocletian take effect, dividing Britain into four provinces and separating military and civilian government.
 Establishment of initial Christian hierarchy in Britain.
 Three British bishops attend the Council of Arles.
 343
 January – Emperor Constans visits Britain, and strengthens northern frontier and Saxon Shore.
 Construction of Pevensey Fort.
 353
 Roman Emperor Constantius II punishes British supporters of the recently defeated usurper, Magnentius, and suppresses paganism.
 355
Julian the Apostate placed in charge of Britain and Gaul.
 359
 Julian makes Britain main granary for western Roman army.
 360
 Picts and Irish attack northern frontier.
 367
 The Great Conspiracy: Sustained raids by Picts, Irish, and Saxons. Hadrian's Wall abandoned and military commander Fullofaudes captured or killed.
 368
 Count Theodosius arrives in Britain with a military task-force, restores administration under Governor Civilis and commander Dulcitius.
 369
 Theodosius defeats invaders, builds new watchtowers from Filey to Huntcliff, re-fortifies northern frontier.
 382
 Magnus Maximus defeats the Picts and Scots.
 383
 Maximus usurps control of the Empire, taking troops from Britain and abandoning the forts at Chester and the Pennines.
 397
Saint Ninian converts the region around Galloway to Christianity.

References

See also
End of Roman rule in Britain
Sub-Roman Britain
5th century in England

 
British history timelines
Roman Britain
 
Centuries in Roman Britain